John Percy Simon (born July 9, 1969), better known by his stage name Percee P, is an American rapper.  Unkut described him as the "legendary lyricist of the subterranean".

Career
In 2007, Percee P released his debut studio album, Perseverance, on Stones Throw Records. Entirely produced by Madlib, it featured guest appearances from Aesop Rock, Chali 2na, Diamond D, Guilty Simpson, and Prince Po.

He has also collaborated with a number of musicians, including Lord Finesse, Kool Keith, Jurassic 5, and Jedi Mind Tricks.

Discography

Studio albums
 Perseverance (2007)

Compilation albums
 Now and Then (2004)
 Legendary Status (2005)
 Perseverance: The Remix (2007)
 Oh No vs. Percee P (2008)

Singles
 "Now They Wanna See Me" / "Puttin' Heads to Bed" (1992)
 "Nowhere Near Simple" / "Don't Cum Strapped" (1996)
 "Put It on the Line" (2005)
 "Percekusion" / "NY to the UK" (2005)
 "Throwback Rap Attack" (2006)
 "Watch Your Step" (2007)
 "The Hand That Leads You" (2007)
 "No Time for Jokes" / "Last of the Greats" (2008)
 "Get Down" (2013)

Guest appearances
 Lord Finesse - "Yes You May" from Return of the Funky Man (1992)
 Kool Keith & Godfather Don - "You're Late" from Cenobites (1993)
 Maestro Fresh-Wes - "Pray to da East" from Naaah, Dis Kid Can't Be from Canada?!! (1994)
 Shazam X - "Respect Costs More Than Money" (1996)
 Aesop Rock - "Wake Up Call" from Music for Earthworms (1997)
 C-Rayz Walz - "Stupid Def" from The Prelude (2001)
 Jurassic 5 - "A Day at the Races" from Power in Numbers (2002)
 Jaylib - "The Exclusive" from Champion Sound (2003)
 Wildchild - "Knicknack" from Secondary Protocol (2003)
 Jedi Mind Tricks - "Walk With Me" from Visions of Gandhi (2003)
 Edan - "Torture Chamber" from Beauty and the Beat (2005)
 Four Tet - "A Joy" from Remixes (2006)
 Mekalek - "The Gritty Bop" from Live and Learn (2006)
 Wildchild - "The League" from Jack of All Trades (2007)
 DJ Babu - "SBX2LAX2OX" from Duck Season Vol. 3 (2008)
 The Heliocentrics - "Distant Star" (2008)
 Connie Price and the Keystones - "International Hustler", "Thundersounds", and "Catatonia (Get Em)" from Tell Me Something (2008); "Four Pound." from Lucas High (2019)
 Grip Grand - "Paper Cup" from Brokelore (2008)
 Jazz T - "Percekusion (Boot Remix)" from All City Kings (2008)
 Terra Firma - "Hall of Fame" from Music to Live By (2008)
 Ivan Ives - "Kill Em" from Newspeak (2009)
 The Whitefield Brothers - "Reverse" from Earthology (2010)
 Beat Bop Scholar - "Authentic Minded Intro" from Authentic Minded (2012)
 Nix - "Encore" from The Nixtape (2012)
 Substance Abuse - "Paper Tigers" from Background Music (2013)
 Dudley Perkins - "Hearing Test" from Dr. Stokley (2013)
 Kid Tsu - "Down Pat" from The Chase (2013)
 The Extremities featuring Ghettosocks - "Keep On" from Instruments (2014)
 Namek - "Universal Energy" from Namifest Destiny (2014)

References

External links
 

1969 births
Living people
Rappers from the Bronx
African-American male rappers
African-American songwriters
East Coast hip hop musicians
Songwriters from New York (state)
Stones Throw Records artists
21st-century American rappers
21st-century American male musicians
21st-century African-American musicians
20th-century African-American people
American male songwriters